The 2018 Indiana Hoosiers football team represented Indiana University in the 2018 NCAA Division I FBS football season. The Hoosiers played their home games at Memorial Stadium in Bloomington, Indiana. Indiana competed as a member of the East Division of the Big Ten Conference. The team was led by second-year head coach Tom Allen.

Spring Game
The 2018 Spring Game took place in Bloomington on April 14 at 12 p.m.

 Due to inclement weather in the area, the annual spring game was closed to the public and moved inside Mellencamp Pavilion.

Previous season

The Hoosiers finished the 2017 season 5–7 overall, 2–7 in Big Ten play to finish in sixth place in the Eastern Division. Following two straight seasons of bowl game appearances, the Hoosiers 2017 record prevented them from going to a bowl for a third subsequent year.

Offseason

Coaching changes
On January 4, 2018, the Hoosiers announced the hiring of David Ballou as new strength and conditioning coach, following the release of Keith Caton, who served one season in the position. On January 8, 2018, the Hoosiers announced the hiring of Kane Wommack as the new linebackers coach. Current Hoosiers linebackers coach, William Inge, will transition to special teams coach prior to the start of the football season. On February 27, 2018, Kasey Teegardin was hired to the position of safeties coach, following the departure of former safeties coach, Noah Joseph.

Departures
Notable departures from the 2017 squad included:

2018 NFL Draft

Hoosiers who were picked in the 2018 NFL Draft:

Preseason

Position key

Recruits
The Hoosiers signed a total of 26 recruits.

Returning starters
Indiana returns 17 offensive players and eight defensive players that started games for the team in 2017 along with punter Haydon Whitehead.

Offense

Defense

Special teams

Schedule
The Hoosiers' 2018 schedule consisted of 7 home games and 5 away games. The Hoosiers first non-conference game was away at FIU of Conference USA (C-USA), before hosting the remaining two non-conference games; against Virginia from the Atlantic Coast Conference (ACC) and against Ball State of the Mid-American Conference (MAC).

The Hoosiers played nine conference games; they hosted Michigan State, Iowa, Penn State, Maryland and Purdue. They traveled to Rutgers, Ohio State, Minnesota,  and Michigan.

Roster

Game summaries

at FIU

vs Virginia

vs Ball State

vs No. 24 Michigan State

at Rutgers

at No. 3 Ohio State

vs Iowa

vs No. 18 Penn State

at Minnesota

vs Maryland

at No. 4 Michigan

vs Purdue

Awards and honors

Award watch lists
Listed in the order that they were released

Players of the Week

B1G Conference Awards

Radio
Radio coverage for all games will be broadcast on IUHoosiers.com All-Access and on various radio frequencies throughout the state. The primary radio announcer is long-time broadcaster Don Fischer with Play-by-Play.

After the season

Season summary
Indiana started the year with three consecutive victories against non-conference opponents FIU, Virginia, and Ball State. In Big Ten Conference play, the team secured victories against Rutgers and Maryland. In the last game of the season, with bowl eligibility on the line, Indiana fell to in-state rivals Purdue 21–28 to finish in sixth in the East Division with a final record of 5–7, 2–7 in conference play.

The Hoosiers were led offensively by quarterback Peyton Ramsey, who finished in fourth in the Big Ten Conference with 2,875 passing yards and 19 touchdowns. Running back Stevie Scott was fifth in the conference with 1,137 rushing yards and 10 touchdowns. Kicker Logan Justus was the team's sole all-conference selection, chosen to the second team by the coaches after finishing in second in the conference in field goal percentage.

2019 NFL Draft

References

Indiana
Indiana Hoosiers football seasons
Indiana Hoosiers football